Batiscan is a municipality in the Mauricie region of the province of Quebec in Canada. It is located along the Saint Lawrence River at the mouth of the Batiscan River.

History
In 1609, Samuel de Champlain, on his way to Lake Champlain, wrote of a Huron and Algonquin encampment one and a half leagues from St. Mary's River, which places it around the modern settlement of Batiscan. A year later, he wrote of having met an indigenous leader called "Batiscan". On his map of 1612, Champlain designated this area north of the Saint Lawrence River as the "region of bastisquan". While the name has virtually remained unchanged since first mentioned by Champlain, its meaning has remained uncertain, possibly meaning mist or haze (as often seen at the mouth of the Batiscan River), pulverized dried meat, rushes, or even making a mistake, taking a misstep.

In 1636, the Madeleine Seignory was granted to Jacques Laferté, and included all the territory between the Chevrotière and Saint-Maurice Rivers, until 100 kilometers inland from the Saint Lawrence River. Subsequently, the seignory was divided into several smaller estates or fiefs, including the Batiscan Fiefdom that on March 13, 1639, was given to the Jesuits to accommodate the evangelization and the settlement of Indian tribes living there. This territory corresponded approximately to the current municipalities of Batiscan and Saint-Geneviève-de-Batiscan.

The actual colonization of the area began in 1666, and it developed according to the seigneurial system of New France. The land granted to each settler was typically a long narrow rectangle with a proportion of about 1 to 10, that would allow each settler access to the river and the road. By 1709, all land bordering the Saint Lawrence River was occupied and a second row was equally divided inland. Over time, the territory of Batiscan grew to have 3 rows south-west of the Batiscan River and 2 rows north-east of it.

Settlers would cultivate a portion of their land, but because of outdated farming techniques, isolation from markets, and lack of roads, agriculture remained a challenge. But with the Batiscan River providing access to the interior and the trading post at Trois-Rivières providing market access, people from Batiscan turned to trapping for survival. Logging also provided opportunities and several sawmills appeared along the rivers flowing through the area.

On November 2, 1684, the Parish of Saint-François-Xavier-de-Batiscan was formed, named by the Jesuits after one of the co-founders of their order, Francis Xavier. The community itself developed as a linear village, stretching along the Chemin du Roy and without any real village centre, exceeding even the administrative boundaries of cadastral parishes. By the end of the French Era, the towns of Champlain, Batiscan, and Sainte-Anne-de-la-Pérade were all connected by a long ribbon of buildings.

After 1712, Batiscan was one of the places in which French settlers enslaved Fox Indians of Wisconsin.

In 1845, the Parish Municipality of Saint-François-Xavier-de-Batiscan was formed. It was abolished a few years later but reestablished on July 1, 1855.

The industrial revolution led to economic development and a small port on the river and the railroad were built. At the Batiscan station, a new small village centre grew. But the economic crisis of 1929 broke the momentum of the Station Village and gradually agriculture reclaimed primary place in the landscape and economy of Batiscan, with commercial and industrial activities remaining marginal.

Because of its proximity to the regional hub of Trois-Rivières, the growing use of cars, and the improved road network, Batiscan is becoming a suburban community, leading to increased urbanization of the Saint Lawrence shore.

In 1986, the Parish Municipality of Saint-François-Xavier-de-Batiscan became the Municipality of Batiscan. On December 31, 2001, it was transferred from the Francheville Regional County to the new Les Chenaux Regional County, following the creation of the new City of Trois-Rivières and the dissolution of the Francheville RCM.

Demographics

Population trend:
 Population in 2011: 940 (2006 to 2011 population change: -0.9%)
 Population in 2006: 949
 Population in 2001: 905
 Population in 1996: 891
 Population in 1991: 869

Private dwellings occupied by usual residents: 443 (total dwellings: 510)

Mother tongue:
 English as first language: 0%
 French as first language: 94.1%
 English and French as first language: 0%
 Other as first language: 5.9%

See also 
 Batiscanie

References

External links

Historical publications
La seigneurie de Batiscan - Chronique des premières années (1636-1681), Éditions du Bien public, written by Raymond Douville, collection "La Seigneurie de Batiscan", cahier no. 1, published by the local historical society "Batiscan et son histoire".
Batiscan s'érige - Prémices paroissiales 1670-1708, Éditions du Bien public, written by Jean-Paul Foley, collection "La Seigneurie de Batiscan", cahier no. 2, published by the local historical committee "Batiscan et son histoire".
Répertoire des naissances de Batiscan (St-François-Xavier) - 1682-1989, written by Jean-Paul Foley, collection "Batiscan et son histoire", 1990, 237 pages.
Répertoire des mariages de Batiscan (St-François-Xavier), written by Réjeanne Bouchard, collection "Batiscan et son histsoire", 1982.
Répertoire des mariages de Batiscan (St-François-Xavier) 1682-1900, compiled by Dominique Campagna, 1971, 83 pages.  (sold out edition).
Répertoire des sépultures de Batiscan (St-François-Xavier) 1682-1995, written by Jean-Paul Foley, collection "Batiscan et son histoire", 1996, 109 pages.

Incorporated places in Mauricie
Municipalities in Quebec